The 1996 Atlantic 10 Conference Baseball Championship was held at Bear Stadium in Boyertown, Pennsylvania from May 10 through 12. The double elimination tournament featured the top two regular-season finishers of each of the conference's six-team divisions. East Division top seed Massachusetts defeated Virginia Tech in the title game to win the tournament for the third time, earning the Atlantic 10's automatic bid to the 1996 NCAA Tournament.

Seeding and format 
Each division's top teams, based on winning percentage in the 20-game regular season schedule, qualified for the field. In the opening round of the four-team double-elimination format, the East Division champion played the West Division runner-up, and vice versa.

Bracket

All-Tournament Team 
The following players were named to the All-Tournament Team. Massachusetts's Nate Murphy, one of five Minutemen selected, was named Most Outstanding Player.

1996 was the first time the league named an All-Tournament Team. Previously, it had named only a Most Outstanding Player and Pitcher.

References 

Atlantic 10 Conference tournament
Atlantic 10 Conference Baseball Tournament
Atlantic 10 Conference baseball tournament
Atlantic 10 Conference baseball tournament
Baseball in Pennsylvania
College sports in Pennsylvania
History of Berks County, Pennsylvania
Sports competitions in Pennsylvania
Sports in the Delaware Valley
Tourist attractions in Berks County, Pennsylvania